Ernesto Góchez Lovo (born September 14, 1976) is a former Salvadoran professional footballer.

Club career
An attacking midfielder, Góchez's started his professional career at Atlético Marte and it spanned fourteen years while also playing top flight football for C.D. Águila, C.D. FAS, Alianza F.C., C.D. Chalatenango and San Salvador F.C.

In 2001, Góchez wanted to leave his first club, Atlético Marte, for Águila, only to see his move blocked by Marte who quickly responded by selling him to rivals FAS.

Coaching career
Góchez was assistant to Argentinean coach Ramiro Cepeda and reserve team coach at Atlético Marte, until being dismissed in September 2009.

In December 2018, Góchez was confirmed as new coach of the El Salvador under-17.

International career
Góchez made his debut for El Salvador in a March 1999 UNCAF Nations Cup match against Honduras and has earned a total of 18 caps, scoring 1 goal. He has represented his country in 3 FIFA World Cup qualification matches and at the 1999 UNCAF Nations Cup

His final international was an August 2004 FIFA World Cup qualification against Panama.

International goals
Scores and results list El Salvador's goal tally first.

He currently acts as an official of the El Salvador national under-20 football team.

References

External links
 
 "Marciano" desde las entrañas - Diaro de Hoy 

1976 births
Living people
Sportspeople from San Salvador
Association football midfielders
Salvadoran footballers
El Salvador international footballers
C.D. Atlético Marte footballers
C.D. Águila footballers
C.D. FAS footballers
Alianza F.C. footballers
C.D. Chalatenango footballers
San Salvador F.C. footballers